Günther Göllner (born 21 June 1941) is a German ski jumper. He competed at the 1968 Winter Olympics and the 1972 Winter Olympics.

References

1941 births
Living people
German male ski jumpers
Olympic ski jumpers of West Germany
Ski jumpers at the 1968 Winter Olympics
Ski jumpers at the 1972 Winter Olympics
People from Poddębice County